Katharine Krom Merritt (Stamford, Connecticut, 9 January, 1886 – Stamford, Connecticut, 5 August, 1986) was an American physician specializing in pediatrics. The Kasabach–Merritt syndrome is named after Haig Kasabach and her. She was also a member of the International Society for the History of Medicine (ISHM).

References

1886 births
1986 deaths
American pediatricians
Women pediatricians
American centenarians
People from Stamford, Connecticut
Women centenarians